Numa Andoire (19 March 1908 – 26 November 1994) was a French football defender and a manager. He participated at the 1930 FIFA World Cup, but never gained any caps with the French football team.

He played for FC Antibes, OGC Nice, Red Star Olympique, AS Cannes, FC Nancy, Toulouse and FC Antibes again.

He coached FC Antibes, Constantine and OGC Nice. He then retired from football and ran a hostel in Juan-les-Pins. He came back to football with OGC Nice and managed team again from 1962 to 1964.

Titles

As a manager
French championship in 1951 and 1952
Coupe de France in 1952 with OGC Nice

References

 Les Cahiers de l'Equipe, season 1963-64

1908 births
1994 deaths
Sportspeople from Alpes-Maritimes
Association football midfielders
French footballers
1930 FIFA World Cup players
Association football defenders
OGC Nice players
Red Star F.C. players
AS Cannes players
Ligue 1 players
French football managers
OGC Nice managers
FC Antibes players
Footballers from Provence-Alpes-Côte d'Azur